Deportivo Tepic JAP Fútbol Club Premier play in the Segunda División in Tepic, Nayarit, Mexico and are the official reserve team for Deportivo Tepic F.C. The games are held in the city of Tepic in the Estadio Olímpico Santa Teresita.

Players

Current squad

References

Football clubs in Nayarit